Tejaswini Prakash is an Indian model and actress who predominantly appears in Kannada and Telugu films.  She is best known for her role with Dr. Vishnuvardhan in Mathad Mathadu Mallige. She appeared in the fifth season of the television reality show Big Boss Kannada.

Career 
Tejaswini made her film debut in 2007 through Masanada Makkalu. She appeared in films including Mathad Mathad Mallige, Gaja, Aramane and Goolihatti.

She also appeared in a few Telugu films including Prathikshnam and Kannulo Nee Rupamey.

She appeared as a contestant in the fifth Season of Bigg Boss Kannada.

Filmography

Films

Television

References

External links
 
 Tejaswini Prakash on Facebook

Living people
Actresses from Karnataka
Actresses from Bangalore
Indian film actresses
Actresses in Kannada cinema
Actresses in Telugu cinema
21st-century Indian actresses
South Indian International Movie Awards winners
Year of birth missing (living people)
Actresses in Malayalam cinema
Actresses in Tamil cinema
Indian Hindus